Major-General St John Desmond Arcedeckne-Butler  (30 November 1896 – 4 February 1959) was a British Army officer.

Biography 
From Hampshire, he was the son of St John Henry Arcedeckne-Butler and his wife, Maud, daughter of Captain Albert Money of Little Stodham, Liss, whom he had married in 1896. He was educated in the USA and Switzerland before entering Royal Military College, Sandhurst.  He was commissioned into the Royal Munster Fusiliers in 1915 and served in France and Belgium. He was one of the two young British officers who were sent to study at the prestigious Ecole Superieure d'Electricite (Supélec), Paris, after the end of World War I.

He transferred to Royal Sussex Regiment in 1922 and then to the Royal Corps of Signals in 1923.

Between 1934 and 1939, he was Superintendent of a Signals Experimental Establishment and an Army Member of the Experimental sub-committee of the Wireless Telegraphy Board.

He was a Colonel on General Staff in the War Office in 1940, and, as a Major-General (temporary) he was Deputy Director-General at the Ministry of Supply between 1941 and 1946.

In the 1946 New Year Honours, Major-General (temporary) St. John Desmond Arcedeckne-Butler (10309), late Royal Corps of Signals, was appointed  Commander of the Order of the British Empire (CBE). He retired from the Army the same year and was appointed a Director of Romary & Co. Ltd., Thermionic Products Ltd. and other companies and a member of the Broadcasting Advisory Committee, Eire.

In 1929, St. John Desmond Arcedeckne-Butler married Ethel Helen, daughter of the late Lt.-Col. R. Selby-Walker, R.E. They had two sons and a daughter.

Arms

References

Bibliography

External links
Generals of World War II

1896 births
1959 deaths
Royal Munster Fusiliers officers
Commanders of the Order of the British Empire
Royal Sussex Regiment officers
Royal Corps of Signals officers
British Army personnel of World War I
British Army generals of World War II
War Office personnel in World War II
British Army major generals
Graduates of the Royal Military College, Sandhurst
Military personnel from Hampshire